Pinklon Thomas (born February 10, 1958) is an American former professional boxer who competed from 1978 to 1993. He was boxing's first 'Centennial Champion' (1886-1986), and held the WBC heavyweight title from 1984 to 1986, along with being the first IBO heavyweight champion, holding the title from 1992 to 1993. Thomas' distinguishing characteristics were his pink boxing trunks and a powerful left jab.

Early life
A native of Pontiac, Michigan, who also lived on military bases in South Carolina and Washington, Thomas eventually settled in Orlando, Florida.

Professional career
Thomas turned professional after just three amateur fights. By 1984, with a record of 24–0–1, he would get his first world title shot against reigning WBC heavyweight champion Tim Witherspoon in August 1984, in Las Vegas, Nevada.

Thomas won the WBC Heavyweight Championship with a hard-fought 12-round battle over "Terrible" Tim Witherspoon on August 31, 1984. Ten months later, he defended his title against ex-champion Mike Weaver, stopping Weaver with a single punch in the eighth round. Thomas lost the WBC title to Trevor Berbick in March 1986 by a decision.

Thomas vs. Tyson

Thomas came back and reeled off three ko wins before setting up a May 1987 challenge to WBC and WBA Heavyweight champion Mike Tyson. Although Thomas allegedly took the fight with a serious shoulder injury, he enjoyed success outjabbing Tyson. After a long break for a torn glove, action resumed in the 6th round where Tyson knocked Thomas out with a brutal fifteen punch salvo, knocking the extremely durable Thomas down for the first and only time in his career. Although he got up inside the count, the fight was waved off.

Later career

Thomas went in and out of retirement over the following years, taking fights against top contenders.

In December 1988 he returned from a 19-month layoff to fight #1 heavyweight contender Evander Holyfield. Thomas looked rusty as he was outmatched over 7 rounds, after which he was pulled out of his corner. Long-time trainer Angelo Dundee advised Thomas to retire and stopped working with him.

Thomas returned in 1990 to outpoint Curtis Isaac over 10 rounds, before being outpointed himself by the erratic and unpredictable Mike "The Bounty" Hunter. A few months later he fought Riddick Bowe and pulled out after 8 rounds. Bowe would go on to defeat Holyfield and become undisputed world heavyweight champion.

In February 1991 he took on hard hitting heavyweight Tommy Morrison but was cut and shaken up in the opening round, and pulled out on his stool. Morrison went on to win the WBO belt.

Thomas attempted one final comeback in 1992, winning twelve fights before outpointing Craig Payne. In his final fight in January 1993 he was upset by journeyman "Poncho" Carter.

A comeback fight in 1999 with old foe Tim Witherspoon was not to be, because a fight with Larry Holmes for the winner could not be confirmed.

Retirement
Thomas now has a foundation, Project P.I.N.K. (Pride in Neighborhood Kids), and is a motivational speaker.

Professional boxing record

References

External links

1958 births
Living people
Boxers from Michigan
Sportspeople from Pontiac, Michigan
World Boxing Council champions
American male boxers
African-American boxers
World heavyweight boxing champions
International Boxing Organization champions
21st-century African-American people
20th-century African-American sportspeople